Unity Township may refer to the following townships in the United States:

 Unity Township, Piatt County, Illinois
 Unity Township, Rowan County, North Carolina
 Unity Township, Columbiana County, Ohio
 Unity Township, Westmoreland County, Pennsylvania